Tiger Lake is a lake in Carver County, Minnesota, in the United States.

Tiger Lake was named from early sightings of mountain lions near this lake.

See also
List of lakes in Minnesota

References

Lakes of Minnesota
Lakes of Carver County, Minnesota